Delirium is the third studio album by English singer and songwriter Ellie Goulding, released on 6 November 2015 by Polydor Records. Music critics were generally impressed by the overall production of the record, although they were ambivalent in regards to its originality. It debuted at number three on the UK Albums Chart and the US Billboard 200, earning Goulding her highest-charting record in the latter country and her highest first-week sales figures in both territories. The album spawned three singles: "On My Mind", "Army" and "Something in the Way You Move".

Background
Goulding has stated that the sound of the album is more pop-oriented than her previous releases. Speaking in an interview, she said: "A part of me views this album as an experiment, to make a big pop album; I made a conscious decision that I wanted it to be on another level".

Singles
"On My Mind" was released as the album's lead single on 17 September 2015. The song received positive reviews and performed well commercially, reaching the top 10 in Australia, Canada, New Zealand and the United Kingdom, and number 13 on the Billboard Hot 100.

"Army" was sent to Italian radio on 15 January 2016 as the album's second single. The song was released to contemporary hit radio in the United States on 19 April 2016.

The third and final single from the album, "Something in the Way You Move", impacted contemporary hit radio in the United States on 19 January 2016.

Other songs
"Lost and Found" was released on 23 October 2015 as a promotional single from Delirium. During the week before the album's release, several radio stations premiered different tracks from the album. "Don't Panic" premiered on Graham Norton's BBC Radio 2 show on 31 October 2015, while "Keep On Dancin'" debuted on Annie Mac's BBC Radio 1 show on 2 November 2015.

The album includes Goulding's song "Love Me like You Do", which was originally released as a single from the soundtrack to the 2015 film Fifty Shades of Grey and became a commercial success worldwide. The deluxe edition also includes Goulding's collaboration with Scottish DJ Calvin Harris, "Outside", released as a single from his 2014 album Motion. The North American deluxe edition contains Goulding's collaboration with American electronic music trio Major Lazer (also featuring American-Jamaican singer Tarrus Riley), Powerful, released as a single from their 2015 album Peace is the Mission.

Critical reception

Delirium received generally positive reviews from music critics. At Metacritic, which assigns a normalised rating out of 100 to reviews from mainstream publications, the album received an average score of 70, based on 15 reviews, which indicates "generally favorable reviews". Peter Robinson of Q remarked that the album "seems to enjoy pushing pop's boundaries, and six years into her career feels like Goulding's first true superstar moment", while noting that her "nuanced lyrics steer Delirium away from homogeneity". Michael Cragg of The Observer wrote that the album "goes straight for the pop jugular, unleashing a relentless barrage of bangers that almost always hit the spot." Matt Collar of AllMusic opined that "it's the unexpectedly appealing combination of Goulding's distinctive voice and the melismatic R&B bent of the songs on Delirium that makes for such an ecstatic listen." Eve Barlow of Spin commented, "Finally, [Goulding is] embracing the responsibility to provide stone-cold tunes without pretense", adding, "Perhaps she's finally come to terms with playing in the major leagues because she's sussed out the sweet spot between pop homogeneity and experimentation." Despite criticising Goulding for copying pop trends and stating the "darker, deeper tones" may have been "a better fit for Meghan Trainor than Goulding", Pitchforks Hazel Cills commended the singer for her "evocative storytelling and ability to craft great dance music".

Jon Dolan of Rolling Stone compared Goulding's change in musical direction to "the country-to-pop transformation her pal Taylor Swift pulled off with 1989", stating that "[t]he songwriting on Delirium doesn't always feel worthy of her ambitions, but Goulding is technically peerless and versatile, maintaining her power and flare throughout and crushing every glassy jam she's put in front of." Similarly, Mark Allister of PopMatters pointed out the album's "rather limited scope of lyric subjects" and concluded, "Goulding's sound has gained an even greater sheen and expectations have grown, and we'll see, in the coming months, whether Delirium is the big album that Goulding is aiming for." Entertainment Weeklys Kyle Anderson viewed Delirium as "too well-constructed and honestly ambitious, and the tracks that land in Goulding's comfort zone [...] rank among her best work. But the album also fails to elevate Goulding to her desired plateau, ultimately making it a narrow and sometimes frustrating miss." Matthew Horton of NME felt that "[t]here's something disappointing about [the album], however undeniable the quality of material." In a negative review for Clash, Joe Rivers expressed that Goulding's voice is "too wispy to hold its own versus the maximalist rave-pop of the day. Throughout Delirium, her vocals are often double-tracked in an attempt to circumvent this, but it largely fails, and the singing is forever fighting for attention amid a swamp of crashing beats and over-zealous synths."

Commercial performance
Delirium debuted at number three on the UK Albums Chart and at number one on the UK Album Downloads Chart, with 38,429 copies sold in its first week, marking the biggest first-week sales of Goulding's career so far. In Australia, Delirium charted at number three, becoming her second album to land within the top 10 and her highest-charting album in the country.

In the United States, the album debuted at number three on the Billboard 200 with 61,000 album-equivalent units (42,000 in pure album sales), earning Goulding her highest-charting album yet. As of February 2016, the album had sold 117,000 copies in the US.

Track listing

Notes
  signifies an additional producer
  signifies a vocal producer
  signifies an assistant producer

Sample credits
 "We Can't Move to This" contains elements from "It's Over Now", as written and performed by 112, which itself samples "White Lines (Don't Don't Do It)", as written by Melle Mel and Sylvia Robinson.

Personnel
Credits adapted from the liner notes of the deluxe edition of Delirium.

Musicians

 Ellie Goulding – lead vocals ; backing vocals ; live percussion 
 Joe Kearns – keyboards, programming 
 Chris Ketley – string arrangements ; choir arrangements 
 Everton Nelson – violin 
 Emil Chakalov – violin 
 Richard George – violin 
 Jenny Sacha – violin 
 Sarah Tuke – violin 
 Max Baillie – viola 
 Emma Owens – viola 
 Ian Burdge – cello 
 Chris Worsey – cello 
 Greg Kurstin – bass, drums, guitar, piano, keyboards 
 Ryan Tedder – backing vocals, guitar, instrumentation, programming 
 Noel Zancanella – instrumentation, programming 
 Ilya – backing vocals ; guitar, bass, keyboards, programming 
 Max Martin – keyboards ; programming ; drums, percussion, bass ; backing vocals 
 Fred – instrument arrangements ; programming, synths, percussion, drums, keyboards, backing vocals 
 Jenny Schwartz – backing vocals 
 Jeremy Lertola – backing vocals 
 Sam Holland – backing vocals 
 Savan Kotecha – backing vocals 
 Annabel Williams – choir 
 Bobbie Gordon – choir 
 Hayley Sanderson – choir 
 Lloyds Wade – choir 
 Joshua Hayes – choir 
 Simone Daly-Richards – choir 
 Janet Ramus – choir 
 Dawn Joseph – choir 
 Ali Payami – programming ; drums, keyboards, bass ; percussion ; backing vocals ; guitar ; synths 
 Mattias Bylund – strings, string arrangements 
 Mattias Johansson – violin 
 David Bukovinszky – cello 
 Peter Carlsson – backing vocals 
 Oscar Holter – backing vocals 
 Robin Fredriksson – backing vocals 
 Mattias Larsson – backing vocals 
 Oscar Görres – backing vocals 
 Ludvig Söderberg – backing vocals 
 The Struts – programming, drums, bass, keyboards 
 Peter Svensson – programming, drums, bass, keyboards, additional backing vocals 
 The Wolf Cousins Royal Choir – gang vocals 
 Benjy Gibson – drums 
 Emmanuel Franklyn Adalebu – drums 
 Doris Sandberg – backing vocals 
 Cory Bice – backing vocals 
 Silke Lorenzen – backing vocals 
 Rickard Göransson – backing vocals 
 Carl Falk – guitar, programming, keyboards, backing vocals 
 Joakim Berg – acoustic guitar 
 Martin Sköld – bass guitar 
 Kristoffer Fogelmark – backing vocals 
 Laleh Pourkarim – backing vocals ; bass ; drum programming, synths, live percussion 
 Gustaf Thörn – backing vocals ; piano, organ, guitar, bass, string arrangements 
 Klas Åhlund – synths, bass, keyboards, programming 
 Jim Eliot – additional synths, guitar 
 Oli Langford – violin 
 Reiad Chibah – viola 
 Richard Pryce – double bass 
 Joel Little – bass, drums, piano, keyboards ; programming 
 Erik Arvinder – strings 
 Calvin Harris – all instruments

Technical

 Joe Kearns – production, mixing ; engineering ; string production ; vocal production, vocal recording ; choir production ; additional vocals production, additional vocals recording ; additional vocal engineering 
 Chris Ketley – string production ; choir production 
 Jason Elliott – string engineering ; choir engineering 
 Bob Knight – string supply ; choir supply 
 Greg Kurstin – production ; engineering ; vocal production ; recording ; additional production, vocal recording 
 Alex Pasco – engineering ; recording 
 Julian Burg – engineering ; recording 
 Ryan Tedder – production 
 Noel Zancanella – production 
 Anders Kjær – additional production 
 Synthomania – additional production 
 Rich Rich – engineering 
 Rob Cohen – engineering assistance 
 Max Martin – production 
 Ilya – production 
 Sam Holland – engineering 
 Fred – additional production, vocal recording ; vocal production, engineering ; production 
 Laleh Pourkarim – additional vocals recording ; vocal recording ; production ; engineering, vocal production 
 Ali Payami – production 
 Peter Carlsson – vocal editing 
 Mattias Bylund – string recording, string editing
 Peter Svensson – production 
 The Struts – production 
 Noah "Mailbox" Passovoy – engineering 
 Cory Bice – engineering assistance 
 Jeremy Lertola – engineering assistance 
 Liam Nolan – vocal recording 
 Rob Katz – engineering 
 Kristian Lundin – additional vocals recording ; additional production, vocal recording, vocal production, vocal editing 
 Carl Falk – production 
 Klas Åhlund – production 
 Jim Eliot – vocal production 
 Joel Little – production ; engineering ; vocal production, additional production 
 Gustaf Thörn – engineering assistance ; production assistance 
 Guy Lawrence – production 
 Jimmy Napes – production 
 Calvin Harris – production, mixing 
 Cameron Gower Poole – vocal engineering 
 Tom Campbell – engineering assistance 
 Simon Davey – mastering 
 Serban Ghenea – mixing 
 John Hanes – engineering for mix
 Tom Coyne – mastering
 Randy Merrill – mastering assistance

Artwork
 Ellie Goulding – creative direction
 Cassandra Gracey – creative direction
 David Roemer – photography
 Richard Andrews – design

Charts

Weekly charts

Year-end charts

Certifications

Notes

References

2015 albums
Albums produced by Calvin Harris
Albums produced by Ilya Salmanzadeh
Albums produced by Jim Eliot
Albums produced by Joel Little
Albums produced by Max Martin
Albums produced by Ryan Tedder
Albums produced by Fred Again
Albums recorded at RAK Studios
Albums recorded at Westlake Recording Studios
Cherrytree Records albums
Ellie Goulding albums
Interscope Geffen A&M Records albums
Interscope Records albums
Polydor Records albums